Mehmet Lütfi Kırdar (March 15, 1887 – February 17, 1961) was a Turkish physician, civil servant, politician and Minister of Health and Social Security. He is best remembered for his long-term position as the Governor and Mayor of Istanbul.

Early years and professional career
Lütfi Kırdar was born 1887 in his native city of Kirkuk (then the Ottoman Empire) to the prominent Turkmen Kirdar family. After finishing primary and secondary education in his hometown, he graduated from high school in Baghdad, Ottoman Empire. In 1908, he went to Istanbul to study medicine at Istanbul University.

He interrupted his university education and entered the army when the Balkan Wars (1912–1913) outbroke. After the war, he resumed his university education and graduated in 1917 as a physician. He began his profession in Najaf (today in Iraq). During World War I (1914-1918), he joined the army again.

After the World War I, he returned to medicine serving in the Turkish Red Crescent. Having met Mustafa Kemal Atatürk during the Erzurum Congress (1919), he subsequently participated at the Turkish War of Independence (1919–1923) as the leader of military medical service. For his contributions, he was later awarded with the Medal of Independence.

Following the proclamation of the Republic in 1923, Lütfi Kırdar conducted special studies on ophthalmology in Vienna, Austria and Munich, Germany. Returned home in 1924, he became Director of Health in Izmir. In 1933, Lütfi Kırdar took the post of an ophthalmologist at the State Hospital in Izmir.

Politics

Kırdar was elected deputy of Kütahya from the Republican People's Party  in 1935. In 1936, he was appointed Governor of Manisa Province. On December 5, 1938, Lütfi Kırdar became Governor and Mayor of Istanbul Province, serving at this post twelve years long until October 20, 1949.

During his term as governor and mayor, important buildings were constructed in Istanbul, among them Sport and Exhibition Center (renamed later Istanbul Lütfi Kırdar Convention and Exhibition Center), Cemil Topuzlu Open-Air Theatre, Mithat Pasha Stadium (renamed later BJK İnönü Stadium), Taksim Square and Atatürk Boulevard, which connects Golden Horn with Aksaray in Fatih district.

In 1949, Lütfi Kırdar was appointed Ambassador to Stockholm in Sweden. In December the same year, he became deputy of Manisa from the Republican People's Party (CHP) in the intermediate election. However, he lost his chair in the parliament in the 1950 general election.

Switched over to the Democrat Party (DP), he was re-elected in the 1954 general election as deputy of Istanbul, and again in the 1957 general election.

Prime minister Adnan Menderes appointed Lütfi Kırdar Minister of Health and Social Security on November 26, 1957. He served in the cabinet until May 27, 1960 when military overtook the government by the 1960 Turkish coup d'état.

He was arrested along with all other government ministers and brought before military tribunal on Yassıada, an island in Marmara Sea. He died of myocardial infarction during his defense in the court on February 17, 1961. Two days later, he was laid to rest at the Zincirlikuyu Cemetery. He is survived by his two sons Erdem and Üner.

References

External links

1887 births
People from Kirkuk
Istanbul University Faculty of Medicine alumni
Turkish ophthalmologists
Recipients of the Medal of Independence with Red Ribbon (Turkey)
Ambassadors of Turkey to Sweden
Turkish civil servants
Governors (Turkey)
Governors of Istanbul
Republican People's Party (Turkey) politicians
Deputies of Kütahya
Deputies of Manisa
Democrat Party (Turkey, 1946–1961) politicians
20th-century Turkish politicians
Deputies of Istanbul
Health ministers of Turkey
Prisoners who died in Turkish detention
1961 deaths
Burials at Zincirlikuyu Cemetery
Turkish military personnel of the Greco-Turkish War (1919–1922)
Turkish military doctors
Ottoman military personnel of the Balkan Wars
Mayors of Istanbul
Iraqi Turkmen people
Turkish people who died in prison custody